Mąkolice may refer to the following places in Poland:
Mąkolice, Lower Silesian Voivodeship (south-west Poland)
Mąkolice, Piotrków County in Łódź Voivodeship (central Poland)
Mąkolice, Zgierz County in Łódź Voivodeship (central Poland)